Richard B. Easterly (born April 13, 1939) is a former American gridiron football player. He played wide receiver the Hamilton Tiger-Cats of the Canadian Football League (CFL), and won the Grey Cup with the Tiger-Cats in 1963.

Easterly played college football at Syracuse University, participating in the Syracuse University 1959 National Football Cotton Bowl, Orange Bowl, Liberty Bowl where he was the MVP, Blue Gray Game, North/South Game, and the US Bowl.  He also went to the College Baseball World Series. He was invited to training camp for the San Francisco 49ers but wound up playing for the Hamilton Tiger-Cats from 1962 to 1964. In his first CFL game, he scored two touchdowns. His most productive period was his rookie season, when, despite playing just four games, he caught 15 passes for 378 yards (25.2 yards/catch), one for 79 yards, and five touchdowns. He also caught 15 passes in 1963 but only one in 1964. He also served as a punt and kick returner.

In 2012, Easterley was inducted into the Greater Syracuse Sports Hall of Fame.

References

1939 births
Living people
American football quarterbacks
American players of Canadian football
Canadian football wide receivers
Hamilton Tiger-Cats players
Syracuse Orange football players
Players of American football from New York (state)
Syracuse Orangemen baseball players